The following outline is provided as an overview of and topical guide to life extension:

Life extension – study of slowing down or reversing the processes of aging to extend both the maximum and average lifespan.  Also known as anti-aging medicine, experimental gerontology, and biomedical gerontology.

Goals 
 Biological immortality
 Indefinite lifespan
 Longevity
 Rejuvenation

Longevity 

 Centenarian
 Supercentenarian
 Longevity escape velocity

Strategies

Research and development 
 Timeline of senescence research

Available strategies 
 Calorie restriction or protein restriction or intermittent fasting
 Exercise
 Geroprotector
 Senolytics

Potential future strategies 
 Cryonics
 Genetic therapies 
 Cloning and body part replacement 
 Cell replacement therapies (CRT)
 Strategies for engineered negligible senescence (SENS)
 Digital immortality through mind uploading
 Suspended animation
 Immunisation

Aging 

 Evolution of ageing
 Gerontology
 Pro-aging trance

Hallmarks of aging 

 Altered intercellular communication
 Cellular senescence
 Deregulated nutrient sensing
 Epigenetic alterations
 Genomic instability
 Loss of proteostasis
 Mitochondrial dysfunction
 Stem cell exhaustion
 Telomere attrition

Causes of aging 
 Cross-links
 Crosslinking of DNA
 Free radicals – atom, molecule, or ion that has unpaired valence electrons. With some exceptions, these unpaired electrons make free radicals highly chemically reactive towards other substances, or even towards themselves: their molecules will often spontaneously dimerize or polymerize if they come in contact with each other. They are countered to some extent by antioxidants.
 Glycation
 Advanced glycation end-product
 Lipofuscin
 Viral infections (acute or chronic)

Theories of aging 

Theories of aging
 Antagonistic pleiotropy theory of aging
 Caloric restriction theory
 Cross-linkage theory of aging
 Death hormone theory
 Disposable soma theory of aging
 DNA damage theory of aging
 Epigenetic clock theory of aging
 Error catastrophe theory of aging
 Errors and Repairs Theory
 Free-radical theory of aging
 Gene mutation theory
 Genetic control theory
 Glycation theory of aging
 Hayflick limit theory
 Inflammation theory of aging
 Immunological theory of aging
 Log-normal theory of mortality
 Membrane theory of aging
 Mitochondrial Free Radical Theory of Aging
 Mitochondrial Theory of Aging
 Mutation accumulation theory of aging
 Neuroendocrine theory of aging
 Order to disorder theory of aging
 Rate of living theory
 Redundant DNA theory
 Reliability theory of aging and longevity
 Reproductive-cell cycle theory
 Somatic mutation theory of aging
 Telomeric theory of aging
 Theory of programmed death
 Thermodynamic theory of aging
 Thymic-stimulating theory
 Waste accumulation theory

Organizations 
 Alcor Life Extension Foundation
 Altos Labs
 Alliance for Aging Research
 American Academy of Anti-Aging Medicine
 American Aging Association
 BioViva
 Buck Institute for Research on Aging
 Calico
 Cryonics Institute
 International Longevity Alliance
 LEV Foundation
 Life Extension Advocacy Foundation
 Life Extension Foundation
 Methuselah Foundation – non-profit organization dedicated to extending the healthy human lifespan by advancing tissue engineering and regenerative medicine therapies. It was co-founded in 2003 by Aubrey de Grey and David Gobel, and is based in Springfield, Virginia, United States.
 SENS Research Foundation – 501(c)(3) non-profit organization co-founded by Michael Kope, Aubrey de Grey, Jeff Hall, Sarah Marr and Kevin Perrott, which is based in Mountain View, California, United States. Its activities include research programs and public relations work for the application of regenerative medicine to aging.

Notable people 

 Aubrey de Grey
 Leonard Hayflick
 Zoltan Istvan
 Saul Kent
 Cynthia Kenyon
 Durk Pearson
 Sandy Shaw
 David Andrew Sinclair
 Roy Walford
 Michael D. West

See also 
 Attempts to engineer biological immortality in humans
 Timeline of senescence research
 Outline of transhumanism
 Degeneration (medical)
 Degenerative disease
 Neurodegeneration

References

Further reading 
 Ending Aging, a 2007 book which describes Aubrey de Grey's medical proposal for defeating aging (i.e. SENS).

External links
 https://www.sens.org/

life extension
life extension
 
Life extension lists